Louis Goethe Dreyfus Jr. (1889 – 1973) was an American diplomat. 

As an experienced diplomat, he served as both minister and ambassador to Afghanistan at differing times; his career at the Department of State ultimately lasted more than 40 years.

Career

After his graduation from Yale University in 1910, he entered the Foreign Service in 1911.

After postings in Berlin, Paris, and South America, he was nominated as the American ambassador to Iran in 1939.

Because of an incident involving the Iranian minister, (who was caught speeding in Elkton, Maryland) and the Elkton police, along with the subsequent newspaper coverage, the Iranian government recalled their minister in early 1936. The incident caused a diplomatic rupture: all consular matters were transacted through chargés d'affaires until 1939, at which time Dreyfus was nominated.

While in Iran, Dreyfus reported on the Anglo-Soviet invasion of Iran to the State Department.

Dreyfus also served as Minister to Iceland, both before and after it became a republic; and Minister to Sweden after World War II. 

He also served as the acting Chief of the Foreign Service Inspection Corps (what later became the Inspector General of the Department of State) from 1947 to 1948, before finally returning to Afghanistan as the United States ambassador from 1949 to 1951, when he was succeeded by George R. Merrell.

Later life

After he retired from the State Department in 1951, he lived in Santa Barbara, California, until his death on May 19, 1973.

References

External links 
 Louis Goethe Dreyfus, Jr. at the Office of the Historian website.

Ambassadors of the United States to Afghanistan
Ambassadors of the United States to Iran
Ambassadors of the United States to Iceland
1889 births
1973 deaths
20th-century American diplomats